The 2009 Dutch Artistic Gymnastics Championships took place in Rotterdam, Netherlands, from 20-21 June 2009.

Medalists

References 

2009
2009 in European sport
2009 in gymnastics
International gymnastics competitions hosted by the Netherlands